The Commission for Complaints for Telecom-television Services (CCTS; French: Commission des plaintes relatives aux services de télécom-télévision, CPRST) is Canada's national, independent and industry-funded organization created to resolve telecommunication and television service complaints from consumers and small business customers fairly and free of charge.

The CCTS was established in 2007 by the Canadian Radio-television and Telecommunications Commission, Canada's telecommunications and broadcasting regulator. All telecommunication and licensed television service providers must participate in the CCTS' complaint resolution process.

In 2017–2018, the CCTS handled 14,272 complaints from consumers and resolved 92 per cent of these complaints. During this period, 41.5% of complaints were related to wireless service, 29.2% in regards to internet services and 10.6% for television services.

Most recently in 2021, the CCTS accepted approximately 17,000 complaints from Canadians in regards to their Internet, phone, and TV services.  Bell represented 20% of all complaints, an eight percent decrease from the year prior. Rogers was in second with 13.9%, Fido in third with 10% and TELUS in fourth with 7% of all complaints. 

The CCTS is accused of unfairness and there are many conflict of interest issues:
 CCTS gets its direct funding by telecommunication companies and pays CCTS salaries
 CCTS has many employees that work also for the telecommunication companies
 Many of CCTS Board members are employees of these telecommunication companies
 CCTS forces all telecom complaints to be filed with them, even those who have already been handled by another complaints agency

References

Telecommunications in Canada
Mass media complaints authorities
Consumer organizations in Canada
Regulation in Canada